Karoline Fuarose Park-Tamati  (born 7 November 1982), known professionally as Ladi6, is a New Zealand recording artist of Samoan descent. She spent six months living in Berlin and touring Europe in both 2010 and 2011. Her debut album Time Is Not Much debuted at number 4 on the New Zealand Top 40 Album chart. and her second album The Liberation Of... debuted at number 6 and was certified gold. Her single "Like Water" was certified platinum in June 2011. She has won many awards, including Best Female Solo Artist and Best Urban Hip Hop Album at the 2011 New Zealand Music Awards and Best Urban/Hip Hop Album at the 2009 New Zealand Music Awards. The current line-up of the wider Ladi6 group is Ladi6, her partner Parks (a.k.a. Brent Park) and Julien Dyne. Ladi6 has been called "New Zealand's answer to Erykah Badu".

Ladi6 is a spokesperson for the Not Our Future anti-smoking campaign. In the 2021 Queen's Birthday Honours, she was appointed a Member of the New Zealand Order of Merit, for services to music.

Early life, Sheelahroc and Verse Two 
Ladi6 was born in Christchurch on 7 November 1982, and raised in that city. Her family moved to Africa for a year and a half when she was a teenager, which is where she says she first started to write and play music. After she returned to Christchurch in the mid-1990s, she started her entertainment career as a break dancer. When she was 16 she formed her first music group, Sheelahroc, with her cousin Tyra Hammond and Sarah Tamaira (a.k.a. Voodoo Child) in May 1999. Sheelahroc released the hit single "If I Gave U Th' Mic" and won the award for Most Promising New Act at the 2001 bNet Music Awards.

After Sheelahroc broke up, Ladi6 went on to form Verse Two with Parks, Julien Dyne, Markus Vanilau, Elia Gaitau, Vanessa Mcgowan, Dj 4130 and Matipi Turua, as well as a variety of guest musicians. They released the singles "Danger" and "Gold" (featuring her cousin Scribe and produced by Mu of Fat Freddy's Drop). "Gold" went to Number 1 on the NZ Alternative charts in its first week of play on the bNet stations and was the 5th most played song on the bNet stations in 2003. "Danger" was re-issued as a bonus track on Time Is Not Much. Ladi6 was nominated for Best Vocalist/MC at the 2003 bNet Awards and Verse 2 won a bNet Award for Best New Act in 2003. Verse Two supported international acts such as The Roots, De La Soul and 50 Cent.

The current line-up of the wider Ladi6 group is Ladi6, her partner Parks (a.k.a. Brent Park), Julien Dyne and keyboardist Brandon Haru. Also an important and vital member of the group is Steve Roberts their sound technician. Ladi6 has been called "New Zealand's answer to Erykah Badu".

Ladi6 has been an advocate for many health campaigns and has helped to profile certain issues through speaking out on social media.
She appeared on Songs From the Inside in 2015 alongside Troy Kingi, MC Scribe and Anika Moa. Mentoring incarcerated women in Christchurch women's prison in songwriting.
Also in December 2014 saw the release of Oscar Kightley's compelling documentary ‘Ladi6 – Return to Africa,’ which follows Ladi6 on a journey of musical rediscovery to where it all began for her, revisiting the times and places where she was inspired 16 years ago to become a musician. The documentary captures an epic adventure for Ladi6, her partner and producer Parks, and their son.

Time Is Not Much 
Ladi6's debut album Time Is Not Much was released independently in New Zealand in November 2008 and debuted at number 4 on the New Zealand Top 40 Album chart, staying in the top 40 albums for 10 weeks. The album was mostly produced by Parks and was released throughout Europe by London label BBE Records in July 2010.

The Liberation Of... 
Ladi6's second album, The Liberation Of... was released in New Zealand independently in November 2010, where it debuted at number six on the NZ Top 40 Album Chart. It spent 34 weeks in the top 40 and was certified gold in July 2011. The single "Like Water" from this album peaked at number 9 on the NZ Top 40 Singles Chart, spent 22 weeks on the charts and was certified platinum in June 2011.

It was co-produced by Parks and Sebastian Weiss (a.k.a. DJ Sepalot) of the German hip hop group Blumentopf and features Myele Manzanza of Electric Wire Hustle, Toby Laing of Fat Freddy's Drop and German singer Esther Adams.

The Liberation of... was released in Europe on German label Eskapaden Records in May 2011. In London, Metro Magazine said Ladi6 was "One to Watch". "She knows how to make an impression – including a recent wow-inducing support slot for Gil Scott-Heron at London's Southbank Centre".

Automatic 
Ladi6's third album, Automatic, was released in 2013. Ladi6 and Parks travelled to the U.S. to work with music producer Waajeed. The album was done at Studio A recording studios in Detroit, with Grammy award-winning engineer Todd Fairall. They also did some recording in New Zealand at Revolver Studios in Waiuku.

Automatic is produced by Parks and Waajeed and features Ladi6 band members Julien Dyne and B.Haru. The album has guest vocal appearances by Scribe, Parks and Tyra Hammond and Detroit MC Invincible.

Automatic debuted at number 3 on the New Zealand national charts and featured on many end-of-year (2013) 'best of' lists.

Collaborations 
Ladi6 has collaborated with many New Zealand musicians and bands, including Ruby Frost, Fat Freddy's Drop, Scribe, Shapeshifter, Jon Toogood, Solaa, 4Corners, The Opensouls, 50 Hz and Riki Gooch (a.k.a. Eru Dangerspiel) of TrinityRoots and Fly My Pretties.

Personal life 
As well as producing most of Ladi6's music, her partner Parks also provides backing vocals for many of her tracks. In 2004, Ladi6 and Parks had their first son. He is their only child.

She is the cousin of other prominent Samoan New Zealand musicians Scribe and Tyra Hammond of The Opensouls.

Discography

Albums

Singles

Featured singles

Awards

References

External links
Official Ladi6 Website
Ladi6 music videos on YouTube
Samoan Bios: Ladi6

21st-century New Zealand women singers
Neo soul singers
New Zealand women rappers
New Zealand people of Samoan descent
People from Christchurch
Living people
1982 births
The Adults members
Members of the New Zealand Order of Merit
Māori-language singers